The statue of Pedro Moreno is installed along the Rotonda de los Jaliscienses Ilustres, in Centro, Guadalajara, in the Mexican state of Jalisco.

A statue of his wife Rita Pérez de Moreno is also installed at the site.

References

External links

 

Outdoor sculptures in Guadalajara
Rotonda de los Jaliscienses Ilustres
Sculptures of men in Mexico
Statues in Jalisco